Richard Sears may refer to:

Richard Warren Sears (1863–1914), founder of Sears, Roebuck and Co.
Richard Sears (pilgrim) (1595–1676), early settler of Yarmouth, Cape Cod, Massachusetts
Richard Sears (tennis) (1861–1943), American tennis player
Richard W. Sears (born 1943), Vermont state senator